Jeanne Hays Beaman (October 7, 1919 – February 12, 2020) was an American pioneer of computational choreography, creating the piece Random Dances in 1964 by using an IBM 7070 computer to select and order movement instructions from three lists. 

Her 1965 article, "Computer Dance", was widely cited by later practitioners, as was a 1968 exhibition of her process at the Institute of Contemporary Arts in London. 

In her early career she studied with Martha Graham and danced with the San Francisco Ballet; she was also Professor Emeritus at the University of Pittsburgh, where she taught from 1961 to 1974.

References

1919 births
2020 deaths
American choreographers
Place of birth missing
Place of death missing
University of Pittsburgh faculty
American centenarians
Women centenarians